Joe Small may refer to:

Joe Small (entertainer) (1830–?), New Zealand entertainer
Joe Small (cricketer) (1892–1958), West Indian cricketer